The Hatania Doania river flows through the district of South 24 Parganas, West Bengal province of India. Namkhana is on its north bank and Narayanpur is on its south bank. There is a ferry service to cross the river and a vessel service for vehicles. A bridge was in the process of construction, and has since been constructed and inaugurated (March 7, 2019).

See also
 List of rivers of India

References

Rivers of West Bengal
Geography of South 24 Parganas district
Sundarbans
Rivers of India